The Daliao River ("Great Liao River") is a major river system in eastern Liaoning province of Northeast China, and formerly the main distributary of the lower Liao River until 1958.

The principal river of southern Northeast China, the Liao River, historically bifurcates into two distributaries near the Liujianfang Hydrological Station (六间房水文站) at Xinkaihe Town (新开河镇) of Anshan's Tai'an County, forming the Liao River Delta.  The eastern distributary, called the Wailiao River, was originally the larger one and the main body of lower Liao River.  It travelled southwards to pick up two large tributaries the Hun River and Taizi River, at a confluence locally referred as the "Trident River" (三岔河).  After the three rivers merged, the resultant large river then adopted the new name as Daliao River.

However, the low elevation and the flat, waterway-rich (and often rerouting) topography of the Liao River Delta region created a huge problem in flood control.  During monsoon seasons the storm surges from the Bohai Sea could go as far inland as the Trident confluence, and when meeting the voluminous upstream water from the Liao River, would frequently exceed the capacity of river channels causing massive spill-over flash floods.  This flood risk particularly threatened the cities of Yingkou (which is immediately adjacent to the Daliao River mouth and home to 2 million people) and Haicheng (which has over 1 million residents).  In 1958, a river engineering project was conducted, and the upriver of the Wailiao River at the Liao River bifurcation was blocked off, redirecting the Liao River flow entirely towards the Shuangtaizi River (双台子河), the originally smaller western distributary of the river delta.  This separated the Wailiao, Hun and Taizi Rivers from Liao River permanently, making the Daliao River an independent river system since 1958.

Tributaries 
 Wailiao River ("outer Liao River"), was originally the main distributary of Liao River and the principal headwaters of Daliao River, but now only an often dry stream channel remains upriver after the 1958 project. This 1.5 km confluence segment of the three rivers is locally known as the Trident River.
 Hun River ("muddy river"), historically also known as Little Liao River (小辽水) or Shen River (沈水), was formally the second largest tributary of Liao River. It flows through the most populous area of Liaoning province, including the provincial capital and largest city Shenyang, as well as the 10th largest city Fushun. The river got its current name from the fast flow speed and high sediment load, which leads to its muddy appearance.
The Hun River's headwaters arise from the Qian Mountains, a branch of the Changbai Mountains, where the river is also called Nalu River (纳噜水) or Red River (红河), and flows into the  Dahuofang Reservoir (大伙房水库), which supplies drinking water to the surrounding cities of Shenyang, Fushun, Liaoyang, Anshan, Panjin, Yingkou and Dalian.  The river's middle section was also called Shen River, which gave name to the capital city Shenyang to its north, and the lower section is also called Clam River (蛤蜊河).

The river was named according to the legend that it was the last site of refuge for Crown Prince Dan of Yan, who fled to Liaodong to resist Qin conquest after the failed assassination attempt on the King of Qin.
Its headwaters arise from hill regions between Benxi and Fushun, and contains the famous Benxi Water Caves.  Like its sister Hun River running parallel north of it, Taizi River flows through some of the most important agricultural and industrial regions of southeastern Liaoning, including the cities of Benxi, Anshan and Liaoyang.

Other minor tributaries 
 Xinkai River ("newly opened river")
 Hutou River ("tiger head river")
 Laodong River ("labour river")

See also 
 Liao River

Geography of Liaoning
Rivers of Liaoning